Martin Brady (born 7 May 1947) is a former Irish Fianna Fáil politician, who was served as a Teachta Dála (TD) and Senator from 1997 to 2011.

Born in Virginia, County Cavan, he was a member of Dublin City Council for the Donaghmede area from 1991 to 2004. Brady was a Teachta Dála (TD) for the Dublin North-East constituency. He was first elected to Dáil Éireann at the 1997 general election and retained his seat at the 2002 general election. He lost his seat at the 2007 general election and was also unsuccessful in the Seanad election for the Labour Panel in 2007.

He was nominated by the Taoiseach, Bertie Ahern to the Seanad on 3 August 2007. He was the Fianna Fáil Seanad spokesperson for Social and Family Affairs from 2007 to 2011.

References

 

1947 births
Living people
Fianna Fáil TDs
Local councillors in Dublin (city)
Members of the 23rd Seanad
Members of the 28th Dáil
Members of the 29th Dáil
Politicians from County Cavan
Nominated members of Seanad Éireann
Fianna Fáil senators